Grassle is a surname. Notable people with the surname include:

 J. Frederick Grassle (1939–2018), American oceanographer, marine biologist, and professor
 Judith Grassle, Marine ecologist
 Karen Grassle (born 1942), American actress

See also
 Grassley
 Ingeborg Gräßle (born 1961), German politician